Rick Villarreal is the former athletic director at the University of North Texas in Denton, Texas.

He resigned in 2016 after 16 years at the University of North Texas.

References

North Texas Mean Green athletic directors
Year of birth missing (living people)
Living people